O. brassicae may refer to:

 Olpidium brassicae, a plant pathogen
 Orobanche brassicae, a herbaceous plant